Pterolophia rubricornis is a species of beetle in the family Cerambycidae. It was described by Gressitt in 1951.

References

rubricornis
Beetles described in 1951